Loyal M. Haynes was a brigadier general in the United States Army and the commanding general of the 2nd Infantry Division Artillery (United States) during the Korean War. Haynes was awarded a Distinguished Service Medal for his exploits during World War II. At the conclusion of World War II Haynes was a passenger on the airplane involved in the 1946 C-53 Skytrooper crash on the Gauli Glacier but survived with only a broken nose. He subsequently commanded an artillery task force during The Great Naktong Offensive in the Korean War. Haynes is an alumnus of Knox College (Illinois).

References

External links
Generals of World War II

United States Army generals
Knox College (Illinois) alumni
Recipients of the Distinguished Service Medal (US Army)
Year of birth missing
Year of death missing
United States Army generals of World War II